This page shows the results of the Diving Competition for men and women at the 1955 Pan American Games, held from March 12 to March 26, 1955 in Mexico City, Mexico. There were two events, for both men and women.

Men's competition

3m Springboard

10m Platform

Women's competition

3m Springboard

10m Platform

Medal table

See also
 Diving at the 1956 Summer Olympics

References
 
 
  .

1955
Events at the 1955 Pan American Games
Pan American Games
1955 Pan American Games
1955 Pan American Games